Alsa Mall is a shopping mall on Montieth Road in the neighbourhood of Egmore in Chennai, India. Established in the mid-1980s, along with the Spencer Plaza, it is one of the oldest surviving malls in the city. Alsa Mall has a variety of shops in and around it. It is also considered to be a hangout location for youngsters during evening owing to the variety of street food vendors who hold business in the mall.

History
Alsa Mall was a private property before it was converted into a mall. Along with the Spencer Plaza, it remained one of the premier shopping malls in the city until the 2000s, when numerous malls began to appear across the city. In 2013, the mall became the first mall to host the state-owned Tamil Nadu State Marketing Corporation's (Tasmac) first premium alcoholic beverages outlet.

See also
 Shopping in Chennai

References

External links 
 
 
 

Shopping malls in Chennai
Shopping malls established in the 20th century
1980s establishments in Tamil Nadu
20th-century architecture in India